Coquand is a French surname. Notable people with the surname include:
 Henri Coquand (1813–1881), French geologist and paleontologist
 Thierry Coquand (born 1961), French computer scientist and mathematician